Oliver Drake may refer to:
Oliver Drake (filmmaker) (1903–1991), American screenwriter and director of Western movies
Oliver Drake (baseball) (born 1987), American baseball player